Pacific Novelty was a developer of coin-operated arcade video games. Deep Death was their first title, which was later licensed by Game Plan and re-released as Shark Attack (1981). Thief, a Pac-Man styled maze chase, was their greatest success.

Development history	
Deep Death 1980 	
Shark Attack (Rerelease of Deep Death)  1981 	
Thief 1981 
NATO Defense 1982 	
The Amazing Adventures of Mr. F. Lea 1982 		
Pop-A-Ball 1988 (non-video redemption game) 	
Pop-A-Ball II 1990 (non-video redemption game)

References

Video game development companies